Gasoline, or petrol, is a transparent, petroleum-derived liquid that is used primarily as a fuel.

Gasoline may also refer to:
Gasoline (film), a 2001 Italian crime film
Gasoline, Texas, a ghost town in the United States

Music
Gasoline (magazine), a Canadian quarterly rock music magazine
Gasoline (band), a southern rock band
Gasoline (Theory of a Deadman album), 2005
Gasoline (The Hard Lessons album), 2005
Gasoline (Key album), 2022
"Gasoline" (1913 song)
"Gasoline" (Seether song), 2003
"Gasoline" (Halsey song), 2015
"Gasoline" (Haim song), 2021
"Gasoline" (The Weeknd song), 2022
"Gasoline" (Key song), 2022
"Gasoline", a song by Karate from the 1995 album Karate
"Gasoline", a song by Moist from the 1996 album Creature
"Gasoline", a song by Catherine Wheel from the 2000 album Wishville
"Gasoline", a song by Audioslave from the 2002 album Audioslave
"Gasoline", a song by Enter the Haggis from the 2005 album Casualties of Retail
"Gasoline", a song by Dieter Bohlen from the 2006 soundtrack album for Dieter: Der Film
"Gasoline", a song by The Airborne Toxic Event from the 2008 album The Airborne Toxic Event
"Gasoline", a song by Brand New from the 2009 album Daisy
"Gasoline", a song by Britney Spears from the 2011 album Femme Fatale

See also
Gasolin' (disambiguation)
Gasolina (disambiguation)
Petrol (disambiguation)